The Cathedral-Basilica of Saint Louis, King of France (French: Cathédrale-Basilique de Saint-Louis, Roi-de-France, Spanish: Catedral-Basílica de San Luis, Rey de Francia), also called St. Louis Cathedral, is the seat of the Roman Catholic Archdiocese of New Orleans and is the oldest cathedral in continuous use in the United States. It is dedicated to Saint Louis, also known as King Louis IX of France. The first church on the site was built in 1718; the third, under the Spanish rule, built in 1789, was raised to cathedral rank in 1793.  The second St. Louis Cathedral was burned during the great fire of 1788 and was expanded and largely rebuilt and completed in the 1850s, with little of the 1789 structure remaining.

Saint Louis Cathedral is in the French Quarter of New Orleans, Louisiana, United States, on the Place John Paul II (French: Place Jean-Paul II), a promenaded section of Chartres Street (rue de Chartres) that runs for one block between St. Peter Street (rue Saint-Pierre) on the upriver boundary and St. Ann Street (rue Sainte-Anne) on the downriver boundary. It is located next to Jackson Square and facing the Mississippi River in the heart of New Orleans, situated between the historic buildings of the Cabildo and the Presbytère.

History

Three Roman Catholic churches have stood on the site since 1718, when the city was founded. The first was a crude wooden structure in the early days of the French colony. As the French were Catholic, their church was prominently located on the town square. Construction of a larger brick and timber church was begun in 1725 and was completed in 1727. Along with numerous other buildings, the church was destroyed in the Great New Orleans Fire (1788) on Good Friday, March 21, 1788. The cornerstone of a new church was laid in 1789 and the building was completed in 1794. In 1793 Saint Louis Church was elevated to cathedral rank as the See of the Diocese of New Orleans, making it one of the oldest cathedrals in the United States. In 1819, a central tower (designed by Benjamin Henry Latrobe) with a clock and bell were added. The bell was embossed with the name "Victoire" in commemoration of the Battle of New Orleans victory in 1815.

Enlarging the building to meet the needs of the growing congregation had been pondered since 1834, and J. N. B. de Pouilly was consulted to design plans for a new building. De Pouilly also designed St. Augustine Church in Tremé, the first church building dedicated as a parish church outside the French Quarter. (The Mortuary Chapel on North Rampart had been dedicated in 1827 as a chapel, and St. Vincent de Paul was established in a little frame church in 1838 but not dedicated.) On March 12, 1849, the diocese contracted with John Patrick Kirwan to enlarge and restore the cathedral, using De Pouilly's plans.

These specified that everything be demolished except the lateral walls and the lower portions of the existing towers on the front facade. During the reconstruction, it was determined that the sidewalls would have to be demolished also. During construction in 1850, the central tower collapsed. De Pouilly and Kirwan were replaced. As a consequence of these problems and reconstruction, very little of the Spanish Colonial structure survived.  The present structure dates primarily to 1850. The bell from the 1819 tower was reused in the new building and is still there today. During the renovation, St. Patrick's Church served as the pro-cathedral for the city.

Bombing 
On April 25, 1909, a dynamite bomb was set off in the cathedral, blowing out windows and damaging galleries. The following year a portion of the foundation collapsed, necessitating the building's closure while repairs were made, from Easter 1916 to Easter 1917.

Visits of popes 
The cathedral was designated as a minor basilica by Pope Paul VI in 1964. Pope John Paul II visited the cathedral in September 1987.

Hurricane Katrina 
The high winds of Hurricane Katrina displaced two large oak trees in St. Anthony's Garden behind the cathedral, dislodging  of the ornamental gate. The nearby marble statue of Jesus Christ was damaged, losing a forefinger and a thumb.

The winds tore a hole in the roof, allowing water to enter the building and severely damage the Holtkamp pipe organ. Shortly after the storm, the organ was sent back to Holtkamp to be rebuilt. An electronic substitute was used until June 2008, when the organ was reinstalled in the cathedral. Originally installed during the cathedral's extensive renovation in 2004, the organ was donated by longtime choirmaster and organist Elise Cambon.

Alleged hauntings
The cathedral is said to be haunted by Fr. Antonio de Sedella, more commonly known as Père Antoine. He was a priest at the cathedral and his body is buried within the church. He is said to walk the alley named after him next to the cathedral in the early mornings. Accounts of his apparitions by parishioners and tourists claim that he appears during Christmas Midnight Mass near the left side of the altar, holding a candle. The cathedral is also said to be haunted by Père Dagobert, a friar who resided in the church. It is said that his voice can be heard chanting the Kyrie on rainy days.

See also
 List of Catholic cathedrals in the United States
 Oldest churches in the United States

References

External links

 Official website
 Roman Catholic Archdiocese of New Orleans, official website
 
 Kendall, John (1922). "The Churches", in History of New Orleans.

Louis in New Orleans, Cathedral of
Louis in New Orleans, Cathedral of
Louis, St, New Orleans
French Quarter
Louisiana (New France)
1718 establishments in New France
Reportedly haunted locations in Louisiana
Roman Catholic churches in Louisiana
Spanish Colonial architecture
Colonial architecture in Louisiana
Roman Catholic churches completed in 1794
Roman Catholic churches completed in 1850
18th-century Roman Catholic church buildings in the United States